David Jones is an Australian drummer.

Jones has played and recorded with a large cross section of bands and musicians.  These include James Morrison, John Farnham, Dragon, Don Burrows, Kate Ceberano, Tommy Emmanuel, Rhonda Burchmore, Dame Kiri Te Kanawa, Don McLean, John Denver, Sam McNally, Linda Cable, AtmaSphere, Carmen Warrington, the Melbourne Symphony Orchestra and the Sydney Symphony Orchestra.

Jones' solo album Colours of the Drum was nominated for ARIA Award for Best World Music Album.

Discography

Albums

Awards and nominations

ARIA Music Awards
The ARIA Music Awards is an annual awards ceremony that recognises excellence, innovation, and achievement across all genres of Australian music. They commenced in 1987.

! 
|-
| 2008
| Colours of the Drum
| ARIA Award for Best World Music Album
| 
| 
|-

References

External links
David Jones Drums

Australian drummers
Living people
Year of birth missing (living people)